HMS Milne was a M-class destroyer of the Royal Navy which served during World War II. She was equipped as a flotilla leader.

Description
The M-class destroyers were repeats of the preceding L class. Milne, being the flotilla leader, was slightly larger than her sister ships. They were powered by Parsons geared steam turbines, each driving one propeller shaft, using steam provided by two Admiralty three-drum boilers. The ship's complement was 224 officers and ratings.

The ships mounted six 4.7-inch (120 mm) Mark XI guns in twin-gun mounts, two superfiring in front of the bridge and one aft of the superstructure. The aft torpedo tubes were replaced by a single QF 4-inch Mk V anti-aircraft gun. Their light anti-aircraft suite was composed of one quadruple mount for 2-pounder "pom-pom" guns, two single Oerlikon 20 mm cannon and two quadruple and two twin mounts for 0.5 inch Vickers Mark III anti-aircraft machinegun. Later in the war, single Oerlikons replaced the .50-calibre machineguns and, still later, twin Oerlikon mounts replaced four of the singles. The M-class ships completed with only one above-water quadruple mount for  torpedoes, but the aft mount was later replaced and the 4-inch AA gun removed. The ships were equipped with two depth charge throwers, two racks and 42 depth charges.

Construction and career
Milne was laid down on 24 January 1940 by Scotts at their Greenock shipyard and launched 30 December 1941. Because of bomb damage to the shipyard, she had to be towed to John Brown & Company to be completed on 6 August 1942. During the war she saw service in the Mediterranean and Arctic theatres.

Postwar service
Following the Second World War Milne, along with three other ships of the same class, was transferred to the Turkish Navy as part of an agreement signed at Ankara on 16 August 1957. They underwent a refit which involved the removal of the after set of torpedo tubes and some secondary armament. They received a new deckhouse and Squid anti-submarine weapons system. On 29 June 1959 they were handed over at Portsmouth. Milne was renamed Alp Arslan.

Notes

References

External links
 Milne at naval-history.net
 Milne at uboatnet

 

L and M-class destroyers of the Royal Navy
World War II destroyers of the United Kingdom
1941 ships